Neviusia cliftonii is a rare species of shrub in the rose family which is known by the common name Shasta snow-wreath. It is endemic to Shasta County, California, where it is known from about 25 occurrences in the mountains around Lake Shasta.

The shrub was not known to science until 1992, when it was discovered east of Redding, California and described as a new species in Neviusia, previously a monotypic genus.

Description
Neviusia cliftonii is an erect deciduous shrub reaching  in maximum height. The alternately arranged leaves are oval or heart-shaped and lined with toothed lobes. The inflorescence is an umbel-like cluster of 3 to 5 flowers. There are rarely a single white petal basal to the stamens, although the petals are often absent. The fruit type is a soft-bodied achene a few millimeters long [anatomically the fruit is an achenetum].

When not in flower, the plant resembles common shrubs such as oceanspray and ninebark, one reason why it may have gone unrecognized for so long.

References

External links
Jepson Manual Treatment - Neviusia cliftonii'
''Neviusia cliftonii''' - Photo gallery

cliftonii
Endemic flora of California
Natural history of Shasta County, California
Plants described in 1992